The Age of Worms Adventure Path (or simply Age of Worms) is the second Adventure Path for the Dungeons & Dragons role-playing game, published over twelve installments from July 2005 through June 2006 in Dungeon magazine. A campaign designed to take player characters from 1st to 20th level, Age of Worms was given an Honorable Mention in the "Best Adventure" category of the 2007 ENnie Awards.

Story 
The Age of Worms is an age of darkness and despair heard of only in ancient prophecies. According to these prophecies, the Herald of the Age of Worms is said to be the undead deity Kyuss, the Wormgod, who is somehow involved with the Ebon Triad, a cult introduced in the previous Adventure Path, Shackled City.

Setting 
Age of Worms differs from the first Adventure Path primarily in its use of established Greyhawk characters, locations such as the Free City of Greyhawk, and items such as the Rod of Seven Parts. Though the series is set in a somewhat abstracted World of Greyhawk (the Free City of Greyhawk becomes the Free City, etc.), supplements were made available online that gave conversion notes for Dungeon Masters wishing to adapt it to other Dungeons & Dragons campaign settings such as Eberron or Forgotten Realms.

Summary 
Age of Worms develops from a small town of Diamond Lake, leads to intrigue in the Free City, and then on to a mysterious cult that serves as a front to bring about the events leading up to the Age of Worms. As the players encounter the various architects of the plot, they uncover the nature of the coming age, and battle the ultimate masterminds behind it. In the end, they face off against the two primary antagonists: Dragotha, a powerful undead dragon, and his master, Kyuss.

The entire Adventure Path consists of the following installments:

References 

Dungeon Adventure Paths
Greyhawk modules